Wilbert Bennie Frazier (born August 24, 1942 – January 19, 2018) was an American former basketball player. Frazier played college basketball for the Grambling State Tigers where he was a first-team All-Southwestern Athletic Conference (SWAC) selection from 1963 to 1965.

Professional career
Frazier was drafted by the San Francisco Warriors in second round of the 1965 NBA draft with the 12th overall draft pick. He appeared in two games for the Warriors.

Frazier spent the following two seasons playing in the Eastern Professional Basketball League for the New Haven Elms and the Harrisburg Patriots.

In 1967, he joined the Houston Mavericks of the American Basketball Association. He was their third leading scorer for the 1967–68 season, averaging 12.4 points along with 8.8 rebounds per game. Following the season, he was traded to the Kentucky Colonels for Kendall Rhine. In October 1968, he was again traded, this time to the New York Nets for  DeWitt Menyard. He played one season for the Nets and was waived in October the following year.

References

External links 
NBA&ABA statistics at Basketball Reference
Page on Frazier's college career and NBA draft selection

1942 births
Living people
20th-century African-American sportspeople
21st-century African-American people
African-American basketball players
American men's basketball players
Basketball players from Louisiana
Centers (basketball)
Grambling State Tigers men's basketball players
Harrisburg Patriots players
Hartford Capitols players
Houston Mavericks players
New Haven Elms players
New York Nets players
Power forwards (basketball)
Sportspeople from Minden, Louisiana